Lieutenant General Conor O'Boyle was the Chief of Staff of the Irish Defence Forces from August 2013 until September 2015. O'Boyle was appointed to the post by the Government of Ireland on 12 August 2013. O’Boyle joined the Defence Forces in 1970 and was assigned to the Artillery Corps upon his commission in 1972. O'Boyle served in Middle East for two years with UNTSO and has been on three tours of duty with UNIFIL.

Lt Gen O'Boyle retired in September 2015, and Rear Admiral Mark Mellett of the Irish Naval Service succeeded him.

Decorations

References

 

Living people
Chiefs of Staff of the Defence Forces (Ireland)
Irish generals
Irish military personnel
Date of birth missing (living people)
Year of birth missing (living people)